The 1959 Italian Athletics Championships was the 49th edition of the Italian Athletics Championships and were held in Rome (main event) from 23 to 25 September.

Champions

Full results.

References

External links
 Italian Athletics Federation

Italian Athletics Championships
Athletics
Italian Athletics Outdoor Championships
Athletics competitions in Italy